Heaven/Earth is the third album from The Free Design, released in 1969.  Produced by Enoch Light for his Project 3 label.

Track listing
All songs were written by Chris Dedrick except where otherwise noted.

 "My Very Own Angel"
 "Now Is The Time"
 "If I Were a Carpenter" (Tim Hardin)
 "You Be You and I'll Be Me"
 "Girls Alone"
 "2002 - A Hit Song"
 "Summertime" (George Gershwin/Ira Gershwin/DuBose Heyward)
 "Where Do I Go" (Galt McDermot/James Rado/Gerome Ragni)
 "Hurry Sundown" (Earl Robinson/Yip Harburg)
 "Memories" (Billy Strange/Mac Davis)
 "Dorian Benediction"

The Free Design albums
1969 albums